Sirius is a molecular modelling and analysis system developed at San Diego Supercomputer Center. Sirius is designed to support advanced user requirements that go beyond simple display of small molecules and proteins. Sirius supports high quality interactive 3D graphics, structure building, displaying protein or DNA primary sequences, access to remote data sources, and visualizing molecular dynamics trajectories. It can be used for scientific visualization and analysis, and chemistry and biology instruction.

This software is no longer supported as of 2011.

Key features 

Sirius supports a variety of applications with a set of features, including:
 Building and editing chemical structures using a library of fragments
 Protein structure and sequence alignment
 Command line interpreter and scripting support fully compatible with extant RasMol scripts
 Full support for molecular dynamics trajectory visualizing
 BLAST search directly in Protein Data Bank and Uniprot databases
 Ability to move parts of the loaded data while freezing the rest
 Interactive calculation of hydrogen bonding, steric clashes, Ramachandran plots
 Support for all major structure and sequence formats
 Bundled POV-Ray for creating photorealistic images
 Integrated selection and coloring across individual visualizing components

Sirius is based on molecular graphics code and data structures developed as a part of the Molecular Biology Toolkit.

RasMol-compatible scripting 

Sirius features a command line interpreter that can be used to quickly manipulate structure appearance and orientation. The set of commands has been patterned after RasMol, so it's fully compatible with extant scripts. Added commands introduced in Sirius provide support for manipulating multiple structures loaded at the same time, and enable more flexible selection.

Extant RasMol scripts can be imported and run within Sirius to produce high quality representations of encoded molecular scenes. Since RasMol uses a coordinate system that differs from that Sirius, internal conversion is performed when RasMol scripts are imported, so that any orientation changes are shown correctly. Any manually entered commands, however, are executed according to the Sirius coordinate system.

Sirius supports several predefined atom-residue sets and color schemes, allows editing of scripts using the Command Panel interface, and logical operators and parentheses can be used to create complex selection commands.

Visualizing molecular dynamics trajectories 

Sirius contains a full-featured molecular dynamics visualizing component. It can read output files from AMBER and CHARMM simulations, including compressed and AMBER out files. RMSD changes along the trajectory can be calculated using user-defined atom subsets and displayed in an interactively updated graph. In order to reduce memory requirements, large multifile simulations may be loaded in a buffered mode. If a simulation involves changes in protein fold, Sirius can be set to track and recompute displayed secondary structure features in real time, which provides a convenient way to observe transformations of the structure. The full trajectory or selected frames can be exported as QuickTime video or a set of POV-Ray scene snapshots that can later be converted to a high quality movie.

Access and download 

Sirius is distributed freely from the project website to individuals affiliated with academic and non-profit organizations. Native desktop application installers are available for Windows, Linux, and macOS.

See also 
 Comparison of software for molecular mechanics modeling
 List of molecular graphics systems
 Molecule editor
 Molecular modelling
 Molecular graphics
 Molecular dynamics

References

External links 
 Internet Archive of Official Website
 Molecular Biology Toolkit
 San Diego Supercomputer Center
 University of California San Diego

Molecular modelling software